The following television stations broadcast on digital channel 3 in the United States:

The following stations, which are no longer licensed, formerly broadcast on digital channel 3:

References

03 digital